The Seattle Fire Department provides fire protection and emergency medical services to the city of Seattle, Washington, United States. There is a total of 1,065 employees with 981 uniformed personnel and 84 civilian employees.

History

The Seattle Fire Department got its start as a volunteer fire department that was taken over by the City of Seattle on April 11, 1884. Insurance investigators charged the city with not having adequately trained firefighters to provide protection for the residents. As a result, the Seattle Fire Department was officially established on October 17, 1889, as a paid professional department.

Fire stations and apparatus 

 the department operates out of 34 fire stations spread across the city. due to mold, Station 31 is permanently closed.

Apparatus types and callsigns 

 Engine (E)
 Ladder (L)
 Aid - Basic Life Support (A)
 Air Unit (AIR10 / AIR26)
 Battalion Chief (B)
 Chaplain units (CHAP3, CHAP4, CHAP5, CHAP7)
 Command, Control & Communication Unit (COM1)
 Decontamination Unit (DECON1)
 Deputy Chiefs (DEP1)
 EMS/Paramedic Supervisor (M44 / M45)
 Fire Boat (FB1, FB2, FB3, FB4)
 Fire Chief (234)
 Assistant Chief of Operations (89)
 Fire Investigation Unit (FIU) / Fire Marshall (MAR5)
 Fire Rescue Boat (RB5)
 Hazardous Materials Unit (HAZ1)
 Hose / Foam Wagon (HOSE18 / HOSE34)
 Marine Unit (MRN1)
 Medic - Advanced life support (M)
 Medical Ambulance Bus (MAB1)
 Metropolitan Medical Strike Team (MMST)
 Mobile Air Compressor (AIR240 / AIR260 / AIR10)
 Mobile Ventilation Unit (MVU1)
 Mass Casualty Incident Unit (MCI1 / MCI2)
 Power/ Unit (P25)
 Public Information Officer (PIO)
 Reserve Aid - BLS Apparatus (All "80 Series" Designations) (A84)
 Reserve Battalion Chiefs (B22, B33, B44, B55, B66, B77)
 Reserve Engine Apparatus (All "80 Series" Designations) (E85)
 Reserve Ladder Apparatus (All "80 Series" Designations) (L84)
 Reserve Medic - ALS Apparatus (All "80 Series" Designations) (M80, M5)
 Reserve Heavy Rescue Apparatus (All "80 Series" Designations) (R80)
 Seattle Police Harbor Patrol Boat (Responds with Seattle Fire Department for most marine incidents) (PTRL4)
 Squad & Wildland Unit (SQ40)
 Staff & Incident Command System (ICS) Support Unit (STAF10)
 Safety Chief (SAFT2)
 Technical Rescue Unit (R1)
 Rehabilitation (REHAB1)

Notable incidents

Great Seattle Fire

On June 6, 1889, the Great Seattle Fire broke out in a cabinet shop located at the corner of 1st Avenue and Madison Street. The flames spread rapidly and the small volunteer department was unable to slow the fire with the town's small water systems. By the time the fire was extinguished,  of homes and businesses had been destroyed.

Pang warehouse fire
On January 5, 1995, the Mary Pang's Food Products warehouse burned in the International District. Four firefighters died when the floor of the warehouse collapsed. It was later determined that the fire was set by Martin Pang, the son of the owner. Seattle's Fallen Firefighters Memorial was built to remember the four who perished.

In popular culture

In the 1965 film, The Slender Thread, starring Sidney Poitier and Anne Bancroft, the Seattle Fire Department dispatch center, as well as the interior of Fire Station # 2 are shown and Aid Unit 2 is seen responding to a report of a suicide attempt.
In 1979, in the Emergency! TV series' movie-of-the-week "Most Deadly Passage", the main characters visit Seattle for a ride-along with Medic One.
In 1985, the department released a cartoon film on fire safety, named  The House on the Hill.
The 2018 ABC television series Station 19, another spinoff of the Seattle-set medical drama Grey's Anatomy, is set in the department and is the first ever TV series to feature it.
In G.I. Joe, the Lifeline character is a paramedic with the SFD.

References

External links
Third Rail, newspaper of Seattle Fire Fighter's Union Local 27, from the Labor Press Project

 
Fire departments in Washington (state)
Fire Department
1884 establishments in Washington Territory